The 1986–87 season was the 88th completed season of The Football League.

Play-offs to determine promotion places were introduced in 1987 so that more clubs remained eligible for promotion closer to the end of the season, and at the same time to aid in the reduction over two years of the number of clubs in the First Division from 22 to 20.

At the same time, automatic promotion and relegation between the Fourth Division and the Football Conference was introduced for one club, replacing the annual application for re-election to the League of the bottom four clubs and linking the League to the developing National League System pyramid.

Final league tables and results 
The tables and results below are reproduced here in the exact form that they can be found at The Rec.Sport.Soccer Statistics Foundation website, with home and away statistics separated.

As of this season, there were no more re-election procedures, but instead, the club finishing last in the Fourth Division was demoted to Conference. The first casualty of this new practice were Lincoln City.

First Division

The First Division championship went to Everton in their final season under the management of Howard Kendall before his departure to Athletic Bilbao. To date, this remains Everton's last league title. His side overcame a spate of injuries to fight off competition from runners-up Liverpool and third-placed Tottenham, as well as other challengers including Arsenal and Norwich City. Fourth place went to George Graham's emerging young Arsenal side who also won the League Cup in his first season in charge. Fifth place in the league went to newly promoted Norwich City, whose manager Ken Brown built a strong squad on a limited budget to achieve a finish which would have been enough to qualify for the UEFA Cup had it not been for the ongoing ban on English clubs in European competitions.

Wimbledon finished sixth in the First Division in only their tenth season as a Football League club. Dave Bassett's men had led the league for the first two weeks of September, but sixth place was still much higher than most pundits had tipped them for at the start of the season. Luton Town enjoyed their best ever season in the league by finishing seventh in the First Division.

Manchester United manager Ron Atkinson had been under pressure for months, after his side's blistering start to the 1985–86 season had ended with them finishing fourth in the league and 12 points behind champions Liverpool. The United board had initially decided to stick with Atkinson as manager for the 1986–87 season, but the United board finally give up on Atkinson in November with United fourth from bottom in the league and having suffered a League Cup exit at the hands of Southampton when they sacked him. Aberdeen manager Alex Ferguson took over, and results quickly began to improve despite no immediate new signings being made, with United finally finishing 11th in the league.

West Ham United, who had come close to winning the league title the previous season, slipped to 15th place in 1986–87.

Aston Villa were relegated to the Second Division just five years after they won the European Cup. Chairman Doug Ellis had sensed from the start that 1986-87 would be a tough season for the club, so he axed manager Graham Turner in September and replaced him with Manchester City's Billy McNeill. But McNeill was unable to stop the rot and Villa went down in bottom place. McNeill was subsequently sacked and replaced by Watford's Graham Taylor.

Villa were joined on the way down by Manchester City and Leicester City. In the first season of the relegation/promotion play-offs, Charlton Athletic beat Second Division Leeds United to retain their top flight status.

No European qualification took place due to UEFA voting to ban English clubs from European competitions for a third season as the sequel to the Heysel disaster in 1985.

Final table

First Division results

Managerial changes

First Division maps

Second Division
There were just two guaranteed promotion places in the Second Division this season due to the introduction of the playoffs and the phased reorganization of the league. Derby County finished top of the Second Division to clinch a second successive promotion and reclaim the First Division place they had last held in 1980. Portsmouth, absent from the First Division for nearly 30 years and who had missed promotion by a single place in the previous two seasons, finally achieved promotion by finishing second. Oldham Athletic and Ipswich Town failed to progress beyond the semi-finals of the new playoffs, leaving Leeds United to take on Charlton Athletic in a two-legged contest for a First Division place. Charlton won the replay to keep their First Division status and condemn Leeds to a sixth successive season in the Second Division.

Financially troubled Grimsby Town were relegated, along with Brighton & Hove Albion. Sunderland's second relegation in three seasons condemned them to Third Division football for the first time in their history as they went down after losing in the playoffs.

Second Division play-offs 

Both the semifinals and the finals were decided over two legs.The full results can be found at: Football League Division Two play-offs 1987.

Replay

 Charlton Athletic remained in the First Division and Leeds United in the Second Division.

Third Division play-offs 

Both the semifinals and the finals were decided over two legs.The full results can be found at: Football League Division Three play-offs 1987.

Replay

Second Division results

Second Division maps

Third Division
The three promotion places in this division were gained by three clubs who were among the least fancied promotion contenders at the start of the season. Champions Bournemouth were promoted to the Second Division for the first time in their history thanks to the efforts of hard working manager Harry Redknapp. Runners-up spot went to Bruce Rioch's Middlesbrough, who had begun the season on the verge of extinction and had been forced to play their first home game of the season at Hartlepool's ground because the official receiver had locked them out of Ayresome Park.

The relegation/promotion play-offs between the Third and Fourth Divisions saw Bolton Wanderers go down to the bottom division for the first time. Newport County, Darlington and Carlisle United went down automatically. The Fourth Division would be familiar territory for Newport and Darlington, but Carlisle had not played in the Fourth Division for nearly a quarter of a century and just three years earlier had been in the race for a First Division place. Defeat in the playoffs meant that Bolton Wanderers would be playing Fourth Division football for the first time in their history.

Third Division results

Fourth Division play-offs 

Both the semifinals and the finals were decided over two legs, and only the aggregates are given in the schemata below.The full results can be found at: Football League Division Four play-offs 1987.

Third Division maps

Fourth Division
The stars of the Fourth Division during 1986-87 were Graham Carr's runaway champions Northampton Town, with young midfielder Eddie McGoldrick being the key player in his side's season of success. Also automatically promoted were Preston North End and Southend United. The fourth promotion place went to Aldershot by winning the promotion/relegation playoffs.

Down at the bottom end of the division, an injury time winner for Torquay United kept them in the Football League after a police dog had bitten one of their players. The introduction of automatic relegation to the Conference saw Lincoln City lose their league status in favour of Conference champions Scarborough.

Burnley – league champions 27 years earlier – plummeted to new depths. They finished third from bottom in the league and only a win on the last day of the season prevented them from going down to the Conference.

Fourth Division results

Fourth Division maps

See also
 1986–87 in English football

References

Ian Laschke: Rothmans Book of Football League Records 1888–89 to 1978–79. Macdonald and Jane's, London & Sydney, 1980.

 
English Football League seasons